"Skin" is a song by American singer Sabrina Carpenter. It was released through Island Records on January 22, 2021. The song marks her first release with Island after previously being signed to Hollywood Records since 2014. It was initially released as the lead single from Carpenter's fifth studio album Emails I Can't Send (2022) but it was ultimately not included on the album. It was written by Carpenter, Tia Scola and its producer Ryan McMahon. "Skin" is a synth-pop ballad.

Composition
"Skin" is a synth-pop ballad with a length of two minutes and fifty seven seconds. It was written by Carpenter, Tia Scola and  Ryan McMahon. McMahon also handled the song's production. "Skin" is composed in the key of G major, and has a tempo of 106 BPM. It uses compound time  in verses and common time  everywhere else with a chord progression of Em-D-G-B-C-D.

Several publications suggested the lyrics are centered around the highly publicized "love triangle" between Carpenter, Olivia Rodrigo and Joshua Bassett, posing as a response to Rodrigo's single "Drivers License", as the track was released only two weeks after Rodrigo's single had come out. Carpenter has since denied the claim that the song is a diss track, explaining that it isn't "calling out one single person". Carpenter has stated that,

"People will make a narrative out of something always [...] and I think this was like a really interesting song for people to kind of misinterpret and make into something that it wasn’t really supposed to be in the first place."

Commercial performance
The week of its release, "Skin" debuted at 48 on the Billboard Hot 100 making it the highest debut on the chart for the week. The song also marked Carpenter's first Hot 100 entry with her previous singles "Thumbs" and "Why" charting on the Bubbling Under Hot 100 at numbers 1 and 21 respectively. Furthermore, the song reached number 12 in Ireland and the top 30 in the United Kingdom.

Music video
The music video for "Skin" was directed by Jason Lester and released on February 1, 2021. The 3-minute long music video features an appearance by Gavin Leatherwood, who plays Carpenter's love interest.

Live performances
Carpenter performed the song live on The Late Late Show with James Corden. She also performed the song at the 2021 GLAAD Media Awards. During this performance, Carpenter sang in front of a montage of videos with transgender youth appearing behind her, "sending a powerful message of love and acceptance to the trans community".

Credits and personnel
Credits adapted from Tidal.

 Sabrina Carpenter – lead vocals, songwriting, background vocals
 Ryan McMahon – production, songwriting, programming, record engineering
 Tia Scola – songwriting
 Kevin Reeves – masterer
 George Seara – mixer

Charts

Release history

References

2020s ballads
2021 singles
2021 songs
Sabrina Carpenter songs
Songs written by Sabrina Carpenter
Synth-pop ballads
Island Records singles